Jordan Wolfson is an American artist who lives in Los Angeles. He has worked in video and film, in sculptural installation, and in virtual reality.

Biography 
Wolfson was born in 1980 in New York. He took a BFA in sculpture from the Rhode Island School of Design in Providence in 2003. .  At that time, Wolfson began producing film and video work and computer animation that was shown in the United States and in Europe.

His more recent works range from aluminum and brass sculptures mixed with digital imagery, works using virtual reality, and animatronic sculptures. 

In 2009 Wolfson was awarded the Cartier Award from the Frieze Foundation.

Work 
Following Wolfson's first solo museum exhibition, at the Kunsthalle Zürich in 2004, his work was widely shown at galleries and museums in Europe, Asia, and the United States. His work was first exhibited in Germany in 2011 at the Kunstsammlung Nordrhein-Westfalen. His first solo exhibition in the United Kingdom, Raspberry Poser, was presented in 2013 at the Chisenhale Gallery in London.

Jordan Wolfson: Ecce Homo/le Poseur, organized by the Stedelijk Museum voor Actuele Kunst (S.M.A.K.) in Ghent in 2013, was the most comprehensive survey of his work to date.

In 2014 a selection of Wolfson’s video work was exhibited as part of the 6th Glasgow International and he participated in 14 Rooms at Art Basel curated by Klaus Biesenbach and Hans Ulrich Obrist. Wolfson was among the youngest artists in the Basel exhibition, a collaboration between Fondation Beyeler, Art Basel, and Theater Basel that also featured the work of Yoko Ono, Damien Hirst, Bruce Naumann, and Marina Abramovic among others.

Wolfson's work is represented in public collections worldwide, including Fondazione Sandretto Re Rebaudengo, Turin; Galleria d’Arte Moderna e Contemporanea di Bergamo, Italy; Magasin 3 Stockholm Konsthall; Museum of Contemporary Art, Chicago; Museum Ludwig, Cologne; Stedelijk Museum voor Actuele Kunst (S.M.A.K.), Ghent; and the Whitney Museum of American Art, New York.

In 2020 the National Gallery of Australia under the directorship of Nick Mitzevich purchased Wolfson's "Cube" for $6.8 million dollars, about half the museum's annual acquisition budget. The final transport and installation of the work was then delayed until at least until 2021 due to the COVID-19 pandemic. The interactive work will allow visitors to perform various acts, including "playing its own body like an instrument".

Female Figure 
Wolfson's Female Figure (2014) is an animatronic sculpture of a woman dressed in a negligée, thigh-high vinyl boots, and a green half-witch mask covered in dirt marks and scuffs. The figure dances seductively, speaking in Wolfson's voice. Using facial recognition technology, she locks eyes with viewers through a mirror. The work addresses the violence of objectification. In 2019 ARTnews and Artnet News listed Female Figure as one of the artworks that defined the decade.

Colored Sculpture 
Wolfson's Colored Sculpture (2016) was first shown at David Zwirner gallery in New York City and later exhibited at the Tate Modern in London, LUMA Foundation in Arles, and at the Stedelijk Museum, Amsterdam. The work consists of an animatronic sculptural figure of a boy attached to the ceiling with long chains connected to his head, arm, and leg. The boy's cartoon-like appearance is based on familiar images of Huck Finn, the 1940s television character Howdy Doody, and the MAD magazine character Alfred E. Neuman. The sculpture's movements - the boy is by turn hoisted up, dropped to the floor, and swung through the air - are timed and regulated by motors built into the ceiling. His eyes are equipped with facial recognition technology that allows the sculpture to make eye contact with viewers present in the room.

Real Violence 
Wolfson's immersive 3-D VR work Real Violence was included in the 2017 Whitney Biennial and immediately became the focus of media attention due to the graphic intensity of the acts it portrays. Real Violence was intended to provoke a conversation about the nature of virtual reality as an authentic experience over which the viewer has authority. The work received criticism at the New Museum screening in 2017. The debate concerned the role of the artist, Wolfson's responsibility in making a political statement with his art, and if there is a role of privilege/power hierarchy that should have been addressed when dealing with the subject matter of violence.

Other notable exhibitions
 2006 – Untitled (Frank Painting Company, Inc.), Whitney Biennial, New York
 2007 – Optical Sound, solo exhibition curated by Alessandro Rabottini, Galleria d'Arte Moderna e Contemporanea di Bergamo (GAMeC), Bergamo, Italy
 2008 – untitled false document, Swiss Institute Contemporary Art New York, New York City
 2009 – The Exhibition Formerly Known as Passengers, CCA Wattis Institute for Contemporary Arts, San Francisco
 2012 – Animation, masks, Alex Zachary Peter Currie gallery, New York City
 2012 – Animation, masks, Kunsthalle Wien, Vienna
 2012–13 – Raspberry Poser, REDCAT, Los Angeles
 2013–14 – Raspberry Poser, solo exhibition, Chisenhale Gallery, London
 2014 – Female Figure, 14 Rooms, Art Basel, Serpentine Gallery, London
 2016 – Colored sculpture, David Zwirner Gallery, New York
 2017 – Real Violence (VR work), Whitney Biennial, New York
 2017 – Riverboat Song, Sadie Coles HQ, London
 2018 – Riverboat Song, David Zwirner Gallery, New York
 2022 – Transformers. Masterpieces of the Frieder Burda Collection in Dialogue with Artificial Beings, Museum Frieder Burda, Baden-Baden

References

Further reading 

 "Jordan Wolfson: Ecce Homo/le Poseur," texts by Esther Leslie, Linda Norden, and Philippe Van Cauteren. Interview with the artist by Aram Moshayedi. REDCAT, Los Angeles, Stedelijk Museum voor Actuele Kunst (S.M.A.K.), Ghent, and Verlag der Buchhandlung Walther König, Cologne, 2013. 
Jordan Wolfson, Marion Ackermann (dir.) and Moritz Wesseler. Interview with the artist by Stefan Kalmár. Kunstsammlung Nordrhein-Westfalen, Düsseldorf, and Distanz, Berlin, 2012. 
 Cotter, Holland. "Jordan Wolfson." New York Times, April 11, 2014.
 Tumlir, Jan. "Jordan Wolfson." Artforum (March 2013): 285 [ill.]

External links
 Jordan Wolfson's Website
 Video: Jordan Wolfson's Female Figure (2014) dancing on YouTube

1980 births
American conceptual artists
Living people
Rhode Island School of Design alumni
Artists from New York City